Magkaagaw (International title: Broken Faith / ) is a Philippine television drama series broadcast by GMA Network. Directed by Gil Tejada Jr., it stars Sheryl Cruz, Sunshine Dizon, Klea Pineda and Jeric Gonzales. It premiered on October 21, 2019 on the network's Afternoon Prime and Sabado Star Power sa Hapon line up replacing Hanggang sa Dulo ng Buhay Ko. The series concluded on March 31, 2021, with a total of 160 episodes.

The series is streaming online on YouTube.

Premise
Veron is left by her husband Mario to be with Laura, which leads to Veron's vengeance that will result in bad circumstances. Decades later, Clarisse, Laura's daughter gets hired to be Veron's assistant. Veron will engage in an affair with Clarisse's husband, Jio once she discovers Clarisse is related to Laura.

Cast and characters

Lead cast
 Sheryl Cruz as Veron Razon-Santos
 Sunshine Dizon as Laura Ramirez-Santos
 Klea Pineda as Clarisse Santos-Almonte
 Jeric Gonzales as Jio Almonte

Supporting cast
 Polo Ravales as Oliver de Villa / Aldo
 Dion Ignacio as Zander Rodriguez
 Dennis Padilla as Mark Veloso
 Lovely Abella as Suzanna "Suzi" Gomez
 Isay Alvarez as Felicita "Fely" Ramirez
 Patricia Tumulak as Gilda Razon
 Jhoana Marie Tan as Sheila Herrera

Guest cast
 Alfred Vargas as Mario Santos
 Cassandra Valerias as Jade S. Almonte
 Fabio Ide as Jose Francisco Pereira
 Joseph Ison as Alfonso
 Tess Bomb as Toyang
 Shermaine Santiago as Ryzza
 Jenny Miller as Nora Tan
 Cai Cortez as Madam Kitchie

Production
Principal photography was halted in March 2020 due to the enhanced community quarantine in Luzon caused by the COVID-19 pandemic. Filming was continued in November 2020. The series resumed its programming on February 15, 2021.

Accolades

References

External links
 
 

2019 Philippine television series debuts
2021 Philippine television series endings
Filipino-language television shows
GMA Network drama series
Television productions suspended due to the COVID-19 pandemic
Television series about revenge
Television shows set in the Philippines